Populism in the United States reaches back to the Presidency of Andrew Jackson in the 1830s and to the People's Party in the 1890s. It has made a resurgence in modern-day politics in not only the United States but also democracies around the world. Populism is an approach to politics which views "the people" as being opposed to "the elite" and is often used as a synonym of anti-establishment; as an ideology, it transcends the typical divisions of left and right and has become more prevalent in the US with the rise of disenfranchisement and apathy toward the establishment. The definition of populism is a complex one as due to its mercurial nature; it has been defined by many different scholars with different focuses, including political, economic, social, and discursive features. Populism is often split into two variants in the US, one with a focus on culture and the other that focuses on economics.

Overview 
A division of American populism into two strains has been suggested: one being an economic form of populism opposed to financial elites, and the other being a cultural populism opposed to intellectual elitism. The economic strain is claimed to have a longer history, including the likes of Andrew Jackson and William Jennings Bryan, while cultural populism is recognized as starting in the 1960s with George Wallace. However, the modern-day rise of populism on both sides of the political spectrum has been said to have stemmed from voter apathy with the current governmental system and those running it, and, subsequently, populist politics are said to play a constitutive role in political realignments, in which moral boundaries between groups are redrawn and categories of "us" and "them" emerge.

Populism has risen in recent years; however, the focus is no longer on the general population protesting against the masses, which was historically the case with populism, but rather on more political polarization, whereby a simple majority is the goal of politicians and thus leads to the "tyranny of the majority" in which they do not focus on appeasing opposing politics but reinforcing their own base. Moffitt argues that modern-day populists, such as Donald Trump, garner support by radically simplifying the terms of the crises and discussing them in terms of emergency politics, whilst offering a short-term response—appealing to the general public and setting such populists apart from the establishment.

Populists in American politics

Andrew Jackson 
Andrew Jackson was the president from 1829 to 1837 and at the time was called the "People's President".  His time in office was characterized by an opposition to institutions, disestablishing the Second Bank of the United States (a central bank), and disobeying the Supreme Court of the United States. Jackson argued that "It is to be regretted that the rich and powerful too often bend the acts of government to their selfish purposes."

Populist Party in 1890s

The People's Party, also known as the Populist Party or simply the Populists, was a left-wing agrarian populist political party in the United States in the late 19th century.  The Populist Party emerged in the early 1890s as an important force in the Southern and Western United States, but collapsed after it nominated Democrat William Jennings Bryan in the 1896 United States presidential election. A small faction of the party continued to operate into the first decade of the 20th century, but never matched the popularity of the party in the early 1890s.

The Populist Party's roots lay in the Farmers' Alliance, an agrarian movement that promoted economic action during the Gilded Age, as well as the Greenback Party, an earlier third party that had advocated fiat money. The success of Farmers' Alliance candidates in the 1890 elections, along with the conservatism of both major parties, encouraged Farmers' Alliance leaders to establish a full-fledged third party before the 1892 elections. The Ocala Demands laid out the Populist platform: collective bargaining, federal regulation of railroad rates, an expansionary monetary policy, and a Sub-Treasury Plan that required the establishment of federally controlled warehouses to aid farmers. Other Populist-endorsed measures included bimetallism, a graduated income tax, direct election of Senators, a shorter workweek, and the establishment of a postal savings system. These measures were collectively designed to curb the influence of monopolistic corporate and financial interests and empower small businesses, farmers and laborers.

In the 1892 presidential election, the Populist ticket of James B. Weaver and James G. Field won 8.5% of the popular vote and carried four small Western states. Despite the support of labor organizers like Eugene V. Debs and Terence V. Powderly, the party largely failed to win the vote of urban laborers in the Midwest and the Northeast. Over the next four years, the party continued to run state and federal candidates, building up powerful organizations in several Southern and Western states. Before the 1896 presidential election, the Populists became increasingly polarized between "fusionists", who wanted to nominate a joint presidential ticket with the Democratic Party, and "mid-roaders", like Mary Elizabeth Lease, who favored the continuation of the Populists as an independent third party. After the 1896 Democratic National Convention nominated William Jennings Bryan, a prominent bimetallist, the Populists also nominated Bryan but rejected the Democratic vice-presidential nominee in favor of party leader Thomas E. Watson. In the 1896 election, Bryan swept the South and West but lost to Republican William McKinley by a decisive margin.

After the 1896 presidential election, the Populist Party suffered a nationwide collapse. The party nominated presidential candidates in the three presidential elections after 1896, but none came close to matching Weaver's performance in 1892. Former Populists became inactive or joined other parties. Debs became a socialist leader. Bryan dropped any connection to the rump Populist Party.

Historians see the Populists as a reaction to the power of corporate interests in the Gilded Age, but they debate the degree to which the Populists were anti-modern and nativist. Scholars also continue to debate the magnitude of influence the Populists exerted on later organizations and movements, such as the progressives of the early 20th century. Most of the Progressives, such as Theodore Roosevelt, Robert La Follette, and Woodrow Wilson, were bitter enemies of the Populists. In American political rhetoric, "populist" was originally associated with the Populist Party and related left-wing movements, but beginning in the 1950s it began to take on a more generic meaning, describing any anti-establishment movement regardless of its position on the left–right political spectrum.

According to Gene Clanton's study of Kansas from 1880s to 1910s, populism and progressivism in Kansas had similarities but different policies and distinct bases of support. Both opposed corruption and trusts. Populism emerged earlier and came out of the farm community. It was radically egalitarian in favor of the disadvantaged classes; it was weak in the towns and cities except in labor unions. Progressivism, on the other hand, was a later movement. It emerged after the 1890s from the urban business and professional communities. Most of its activists had opposed populism. It was elitist, and emphasized education and expertise. Its goals were to enhance efficiency, reduce waste, and enlarge the opportunities for upward social mobility. However, some former Populists changed their emphasis after 1900 and supported progressive reforms.

Huey Long 
Huey Long was the governor of Louisiana (1928–1932) and a US senator (1932–1935). He has been referred to as a demagogue and a populist, with his slogan being "every man a king". He advocated for wealth redistribution through the Share Our Wealth initiative. After announcing a bid to run in the 1936 United States presidential election, he was assassinated.

George Wallace 
George Wallace was a governor of Alabama who ran for president four times, seeking the Democratic Party nomination in 1964, 1972, and 1976, as well as being the candidate for the American Independent Party in the 1968 United States presidential election. In 1972, he was shot five times while campaigning and left paralyzed from the waist down. His main political ambition was to protect segregation, proclaiming, "say segregation now, segregation tomorrow, segregation forever." He also singled out "pointy-headed intellectuals" and "briefcase-toting bureaucrats", leading to his being labeled a populist.

Ross Perot 
Ross Perot has also been associated with American populism and has been called a "billionaire populist". He ran as a third party candidate in the 1992 United States presidential election, gaining 19 million votes. Among his policy proposals was the instalment of e-democracy for direct democratic decision-making. Donald Trump later considered running for Perot's Reform party in the 2000 United States presidential election.

Sarah Palin 
Sarah Palin was the governor of Alaska from 2006 to 2009 and the vice presidential candidate for the 2008 United States presidential election. She has been referred to as a cultural populist in the vein of Wallace.

Donald Trump 
Donald Trump, president from 2017 to 2021, has also been referred to as a populist. His rhetoric presented him as a leader who "alone can fix" the problems of American politics and represent the "forgotten men and women of our country", with echoes of the populism of Jackson's presidency. Donald Trump's modern populism is argued to show the symbiotic relationship between nationalism and populism. Moreover, the rise of Trump's election was argued by some scholars to represent the "tyranny of the majority", whereby Trump's attacks on liberal and progressive politics allowed him to gain enough voters to win, so he did not need to appease the majority of voters or be a president for "every American".

Bernie Sanders 
Bernie Sanders has been called a populist from the opposite side of the political spectrum to Trump. However, differences have also been seen between the two. Sanders' populism is opposed to political, corporate, and media elites, especially the US financial industry epitomized by Wall Street, as well as the wealthiest one percent. When he did not win the Democratic nomination for president in the 2016 Democratic Party presidential primaries, he was re-elected as an independent senator for his home state Vermont in 2018. Other populist Democratic politicians in Sanders' vein include Elizabeth Warren and Alexandria Ocasio-Cortez.

See also 

 Anti-intellectualism in American Life
 The Paranoid Style in American Politics
 Political culture of the United States
 Working class in the United States

External sources 

 Donald Trump and American Populism by Richard S. Conley

References

Further reading
 Betz, Hans-Georg. "A distant mirror: Nineteenth-century populism, nativism, and contemporary right-wing radical politics". Democracy and Security 9.3 (2013): 200-220. online

 Conley, Richard S. Donald Trump and American Populism (Edinburgh University Press. 2020)

 Critchlow, Donald T. In Defense of Populism: Protest and American Democracy (2020), interpretations by conservative scholar; excerpt

 Fahey, James J. "Building Populist Discourse: An Analysis of Populist Communication in American Presidential Elections, 1896–2016". Social Science Quarterly 102.4 (2021): 1268-1288. online
 Goebel, Thomas. "The political economy of American populism from Jackson to the New Deal". Studies in American Political Development 11.1 (1997): 109-148.

 McMath, Robert C. American populism: A social history, 1877-1898 (1993).

Historiography
 Holmes, William F. "Populism: In search of context". Agricultural History 64.4 (1990): 26-58 online.

 Kaltwasser, Cristobal Rovira et al. eds. The Oxford Handbook of Populism (Oxford University Press, 2019), global coverage; excerpt, ch 12 and passim

 McMath, Robert C. "C. Vann Woodward and the burden of southern populism". Journal of Southern History 67.4 (2001): 741-768. historiography of C. Vann Woodward see online
 Webb, Samuel L. "Southern politics in the age of populism and progressivism: A historiographical essay". in A Companion to the American South (2002): 321-35.

External links

 
Politics of the United States